Thomas Laughnan VC (August 1824 – 23 July 1864) was an Irish recipient of the Victoria Cross, the highest and most prestigious award for gallantry in the face of the enemy that can be awarded to British and Commonwealth forces.

Details
He was approximately 33 years old, and a Gunner in the Bengal Artillery, Bengal Army during the Indian Mutiny when the following deeds took place at the Relief of Lucknow for which he was awarded the VC.

He died in County Galway on 23 July 1864.

The medal
His Victoria Cross is displayed at the Royal Artillery Museum, Woolwich, London.

References

Listed in order of publication year 
The Register of the Victoria Cross (1981, 1988 and 1997)

Ireland's VCs  (Dept of Economic Development, 1995)
Monuments to Courage (David Harvey, 1999)
Irish Winners of the Victoria Cross (Richard Doherty & David Truesdale, 2000)

External links
Location of grave and VC medal (Co. Galaway, Ireland)

1824 births
1864 deaths
19th-century Irish people
Irish soldiers in the British East India Company Army
People from County Galway
Irish recipients of the Victoria Cross
Indian Rebellion of 1857 recipients of the Victoria Cross
Bengal Artillery soldiers
Military personnel from County Galway